The Japanese spurdog (Squalus japonicus) is a dogfish, a member of the family Squalidae. It is found in the western Pacific Ocean – southeastern Japan and the East China Sea, including the Republic of Korea, the Philippines, and the Arafura Sea.

References 

 

Squalus
Ovoviviparous fish
Fish described in 1908